The C-Port Trojans are a member of the East Coast Basketball League (ECBL). The Trojans previously competed in the American Basketball Association during 2010–11 season.

The Trojans are located in Savannah, Georgia, with home games played on the campus of Savannah High School.

History
An expansion team in the ABA, Savannah finished their first regular season 11–6, third place in the Southeast Division. Savannah was selected to host the six-team regional. On March 12, 2011, the Storm won their first-ever playoff game, 102–94 over the Columbus Riverballers. The team followed that historic victory with a 162–152 win over the Heartland Prowl in the second round of the ABA Playoffs. Their run ended in the third round, losing to the South Central Division champion East Kentucky Energy.

On October 21, 2014, the ECBL announced the Storm as the 11th league member.

In November 2017 the Storm announced the addition of co-owner Demetrius Holloway. The team rebranded as C-Port Trojans.

Season by season

References

External links
C-Port Trojans website

Basketball teams in Savannah, Georgia
Basketball teams established in 2010
2010 establishments in Georgia (U.S. state)